A municipal election took place in Chile on 28 October 2012. The newly elected mayors and councilmen will begin their term on 6 December 2012.

This was the first election carried out under a new law in which all potential voters were automatically enrolled and in which voting was made voluntary.

Results

Mayoral election

Preliminary results with 95.24% of polling stations counted.

Councilmen election

Preliminary results with 76.95% of polling stations counted.

See also
 2012 Concertación municipal primary election

External links
  Electoral Service (Servel) - Preliminary results.
  Ministry of Interior - Preliminary results.

References

2012 elections in Chile
Elections in Chile
October 2012 events in South America
Presidency of Sebastián Piñera